Parker Homestead State Park is a former Montana state park located in southeastern Jefferson County, near Three Forks, Montana in the United States. It is eight miles (13 km) west of Three Forks on Montana Highway 2. The park is just  in size and serves to preserve a sod-roofed log cabin that was built in the early 1900s. The cabin is very similar to many of the first homes built by the settlers of frontier Montana. In a cost-saving measure, the Montana state park commission let its lease on the park expire on January 1, 2010 and the homestead reverted to private ownership.

References

Protected areas of Jefferson County, Montana
State parks of Montana
Protected areas disestablished in 2010
2010 disestablishments in Montana